Kenneth MacCorquodale (June 26, 1919 - February 28, 1986) was an American psychologist who played a major role in developing scientifically validated operant conditioning methods. He was a student of B. F. Skinner at the University of Minnesota.

References

External links
MacCorquodale's On Chomsky's review of Skinner's Verbal Behavior.

20th-century American psychologists
University of Minnesota alumni
1919 births
1986 deaths